Amadou Ndiaye (born 6 December 1992) is a Senegalese athlete specialsing in the 400 metres hurdles. He won the silver at the 2013 Summer Universiade.

His personal best in the event is 49.41 seconds set in Durban in 2016.

Competition record

References

1992 births
Living people
Senegalese male hurdlers
World Athletics Championships athletes for Senegal
Athletes (track and field) at the 2016 Summer Olympics
Olympic athletes of Senegal
Universiade medalists in athletics (track and field)
Universiade medalists for Senegal
Competitors at the 2015 Summer Universiade
Competitors at the 2011 Summer Universiade
Medalists at the 2013 Summer Universiade
Islamic Solidarity Games competitors for Senegal
Islamic Solidarity Games medalists in athletics
21st-century Senegalese people